John Mlacak (February 27, 1936 – September 19, 2014) was a Canadian politician and painter. He served as reeve of March Township, Ontario from 1968 to 1976.

Life 
Mlacak was born in 1936 in Windsor, Ontario, the son of Croat immigrants. He received a bachelor's and master's degree in engineering from Queen's University. After his education, he began working for the Northern Electric Company, which later became Nortel.  He stayed with Nortel until 1995. During his career, he also served as a commissioner with the National Capital Commission and was on the planning committee for the Regional Municipality of Ottawa-Carleton.

In 1964, Mlacak and his wife were one of the first families to move to the new subdivision of Beaverbrook. He was interested in planning issues and was excited about the prospect of beginning a community from scratch, which spurred an interest to enter politics. He served as reeve of the then-mostly rural March Township from 1968 to 1976. The rapidly suburbanizing township would become the City of Kanata in 1978, and would later be amalgamated into Ottawa in 2001.

During his retirement, Mlacak focused on a career in painting. He co-founded the Kanata Civic Art Gallery and one of his works was featured in the Croatian Embassy. He was elected as a member of the Society of Canadian Artists in 2009.

External links
John Mlacak Fine Art 
Obituary 
Kanata Civic Art Gallery Biography

References

Reeves of March Township
Queen's University at Kingston alumni
Canadian male painters
1936 births
2014 deaths
Canadian people of Croatian descent
Artists from Windsor, Ontario
Politicians from Windsor, Ontario